Diplocladus is a gens of beetles in the subfamily Tillinae.

Species 
Diplocladus arabicus - Diplocladus bipunctatus - Diplocladus compactus - Diplocladus ebureofasciatus - Diplocladus kuwerti - Diplocladus louvelii - Diplocladus nigrinus - Diplocladus oculicollis - Diplocladus pulcher - Diplocladus rufobasalis - Diplocladus rufus

References 

 Gerstmeier, R.; Weiss, I. 2009: Revision of the genera Diplocladus Fairmaire and Strotocera Schenkling (Coleoptera: Cleridae, Tillinae). Zootaxa 2242: 1–54
 Liste de coléoptères recueillis a la Terre de Feu par la mission de la Romanche et description des espéces nouvelles. L Fairmaire, Annales de la Société Entomologique de France, 1885
 Diagnoses des coléoptères nouveaux de la Terre de Feu. L Fairmaire, Naturaliste, 1885

External links 
 
 

Tillinae
Cleridae genera